Plains of Oblivion is the second studio album by former Nevermore guitarist Jeff Loomis, released on April 6, 2012 through Century Media Records; a limited Digipak edition was also released, containing two bonus tracks. The album reached the top 200 on five different U.S. Billboard charts. It features a number of guest musicians including Emperor singer Ihsahn, as well as guitarists Marty Friedman, Tony MacAlpine and Chris Poland.

Critical reception

The staff at Sputnikmusic gave Plains of Oblivion a score of 3.5 out of 5, calling it "an excellent album for fans of heavy metal/thrash" and "an intense tour de force, one that further cements Jeff Loomis as one of the greatest shredders of all time."

Track listing

Personnel
Jeff Loomis – guitar, programming, arrangement
Christine Rhoades – vocals (tracks 4, 8, 11, 12)
Ihsahn – vocals (track 7)
Marty Friedman – guitar (track 1)
Tony MacAlpine – guitar (track 2)
Attila Vörös – guitar (track 5)
Chris Poland – guitar (track 6)
Aaron Smith – guitar (track 6), programming (track 6), arrangement (track 6), engineering, mixing, production
Dirk Verbeuren – drums
Shane Lentz – bass
Jason Lackie – engineering
Jens Bogren – mastering

Chart performance

References

External links
"Jeff Loomis - Plains Of Oblivion Review" at About.com
"Album Review: Jeff Loomis – Plains Of Oblivion" at Metal Assault

2012 albums
Century Media Records albums